The 1929 Volta a Catalunya was the 11th edition of the Volta a Catalunya cycle race and was held from 8 September to 15 September 1929. The race started and finished in Barcelona. The race was won by Mariano Cañardo.

Route and stages

General classification

References

1929
Volta
1929 in Spanish road cycling
September 1929 sports events